Edgar Odell Lovett (April 14, 1871 – August 13, 1957) was an American educator and education administrator.

He was the first president of Rice Institute (now Rice University) in Houston, Texas. Lovett was recommended to the post by Woodrow Wilson, then president of Princeton University.

Biography

Early life and career
Lovett was born in Shreve, Ohio, to Zephania and Maria Elizabeth (née Spreng) Lovett. After graduating from Shreve High School, he earned his B.A. at Bethany College in Bethany, West Virginia, in 1890.  Lovett taught and studied at West Kentucky College, in Mayfield, Kentucky, and completed his first doctorate degree at the University of Virginia in 1895.  He completed his second doctorate in mathematics under the instruction of Sophus Lie at the University of Leipzig.  In 1897, Lovett lectured at Johns Hopkins University, the University of Virginia, and the University of Chicago. In September 1897 he became an instructor at Princeton University, and in December he married Mary Ellen Hale. Mary Ellen was the daughter of the founder and head of West Kentucky College and the two met while he was there from 1890 to 1892 (Mary Ellen graduated from West Kentucky in 1892). He worked his way from instructor to assistant professor of mathematics (1898), professor (1900), and finally the head of the Department of Mathematics and Astronomy at Princeton (1908). He was elected as a member of the American Philosophical Society in 1904.

When planning Rice Institute, the board of trustees sought recommendations for the role of president from the presidents of other universities. Lovett was chosen on the recommendation of Woodrow Wilson, then president of Princeton, and was invited to become Rice's first president in 1907. He accepted and was inaugurated in 1908. Following his inauguration, Lovett was deeply involved in the planning of the university. He oversaw the acquisition of a new site for the campus, the initial architectural planning, the development of the curriculum, and the recruitment of faculty and students. Additionally, Lovett went on a world tour to study the workings of universities and technological institutes in Europe and Japan. Lovett announced his retirement from Rice in 1941, but stayed on through World War II, finally resigning on March 1, 1946. He was succeeded by William Vermillion Houston.

Family
Lovett and his wife had two daughters and two sons.

Mary Ellen became homebound with severe arthritis and rarely left their residence at the Plaza Hotel in Houston from 1929 until her death in 1952.  Lovett died in 1957 at Houston hospital after a two-week illness, and is buried at Glenwood Cemetery in Houston, Texas.

Adelaide Lovett graduated from Rice Institute, then went to study at the Sorbonne in Paris. Her mother stayed in Paris with her. In 1922, Adelaide earned her diplome de la Sorbonne, and returned to Houston. Later that year she married Walter Browne "W." Baker (son of James A. Baker and brother of James A. Baker Jr.), a prominent Houston banker who was awarded the Department of the Navy's Distinguished Civilian Service for his service during World War II in managing the purchasing of equipment for the Navy. Adelaide was a co-founder and first president of the Houston Junior League in 1924.

Henry Malcolm Lovett graduated from Rice and then obtained a law degree from Harvard University. After returning to Houston he joined the law firm of Baker & Botts (Baker, Botts, Parker & Garwood, now Baker Botts) in 1924 (with James A. Baker Jr., father of James Addison Baker III), and served as chairman of the Rice University board of trustees 1967 to 1973. He served on the Board of Advisors of Harvard Law School from 1965 to 1971. Henry and his wife Martha Wicks set up the Henry Malcolm Lovett Endowment Fund for the Fondren Library and the Martha and Henry Malcolm Lovett Distinguished Service Professor of Musicology at Rice University.

Legacy
Lovett Boulevard in southwest Houston, which runs from Taft Street west to just south of Westheimer Road, was named in his honor.
The administration building was renamed Lovett Hall on December 4, 1947, to honor then-President Emeritus Lovett.
Lovett College, a residential college at Rice University, was named after him.
As part of Rice University's centennial celebrations in 2012, an 8-foot bronze sculpture of Lovett was erected .
Edgar Odell Lovett Elementary School was named for him.

References

External links
 

 Guide to the Rice Institute President Edgar Odell Lovett papers, 1907-1954 (Woodson Research Center, Fondren Library, Rice University, Houston, TX, USA)
 Guide to the Edgar Odell Lovett and Mary Ellen Hale Lovett Family papers, 1849-1979 (Woodson Research Center, Fondren Library, Rice University, Houston, TX, USA)

Further reading

Boles, John B., (2007). – University Builder: Edgar Odell Lovett and the Founding of the Rice Institute. – Baton Rouge, Louisiana: Louisiana State University Press. – 

1871 births
1957 deaths
19th-century American mathematicians
20th-century American mathematicians
American Disciples of Christ
Bethany College (West Virginia) alumni
Burials at Glenwood Cemetery (Houston, Texas)
Geometers
Johns Hopkins University faculty
Leipzig University alumni
People from Houston
People from Shreve, Ohio
Presidents of Rice University
Princeton University faculty
University of Chicago faculty
University of Virginia alumni
Members of the American Philosophical Society